The discography of Mexican Latin pop singer—songwriter Cristian Castro.

Albums

Studio albums

Live albums

Compilation albums

Singles

As featured performer

Other duets
"Después De Ti… ¿Qué?" — José Feliciano
"El Día Que Te Conocí" — Armando Manzanero
"Ella" (Her) — José Alfredo Jiménez
"Flying Without Wings" — Westlife
"Primavera" ("Spring") — Carlos Santana
"Nada Sin Tu Amor" ("Nothing Without Your Love") — Tamara
"Todo Para Ti" ("Everything For You") — "Michael Jackson, Luis Miguel, Ricky Martín, Julio Iglesias, etc."
"El Poder de la Música" ("The Power Of Music") "(Live) — Feat. Various Artists"
"Que voy Hacer Conmigo ("That I go To do with Me") — César Franco
"Es Amor ("It is a love") — Yanni & Ranga
"Ni La Fuerza Del Destino ("Not even the force of the destiny") — Yanni
"Mil Besos ("Thousand kisses") — Victor Yturbe
"El Culpable Soy Yo"— RKM & Ken—Y (reggaeton version), Carlos y Alejandra (bachata version), Banda MS (banda version)
"No Me Digas (Remix)" — Jayko
"Somos El Mundo" — With various artists
"Te Amaré Más Allá" – Ha*Ash
"Luces De Nueva York" - La Sonora Santanera
"Así Era Ella" - Elvis Crespo

Music videos

References

Latin pop music discographies
Discographies of Mexican artists